Lara Magoni (born 29 January 1969) is a retired Italian alpine skier and politician. She competed at the 1992, 1994 and the 1998 Winter Olympics.

She is only homonymous, but she is not related to the other Italian skier Paoletta Magoni.

Career
She was the silver medal winner at the 1997 Alpine World Ski Championships.

World Cup victories

References

External links
 

1969 births
Living people
Sportspeople from the Province of Bergamo
Italian female alpine skiers
Alpine skiers at the 1992 Winter Olympics
Alpine skiers at the 1994 Winter Olympics
Alpine skiers at the 1998 Winter Olympics
Olympic alpine skiers of Italy
Brothers of Italy politicians
21st-century Italian women